Satya Prakash is an Indian actor and director who works primarily in Telugu films.

Career 
Satya Prakash has portrayed negative characters in over six hundred films across thirteen languages. He made his directorial debut with Ullala Ullala (2020) starring his son Nataraj and Noorin Shereef.

Filmography

Telugu films

Other language films

References

External links 

Telugu male actors
Living people
Telugu film directors
Indian male film actors
Male actors in Telugu cinema
Male actors in Kannada cinema
Year of birth missing (living people)